The 1939 NYU Violets football team represented New York University in the 1939 college football season. In Mal Stevens's 6th season at NYU, the Violets compiled a 5–4 record, and managed to secure a place on the AP poll for the first and only time in program history for three weeks.  They also defeated #15 Carnegie Tech 6–0 for their 2nd and final win over a ranked college football program, the other victory coming against #8 Fordham in 1936.

Schedule

References

NYU
NYU Violets football seasons
NYU Violets football
University Heights, Bronx
Sports in the Bronx